Think Pink is an Italian sportswear brand offering clothes and accessories, for men, women, and children founded in the late 1970s and come to success in the early eighties. Previously owned by the Tecnica Group., is now a trademark belonging to Man Socks Italia S.r.l.

References

External links 
Think Pink official home page

Tecnica Group
Clothing companies of Italy
Clothing companies established in 1979
Italian brands
Italian companies established in 1979